The Carnegie Hall Performance (2006) is Lewis Black's fifth album, and winner of the Grammy Award for Best Comedy Album at the 49th Annual Grammy Awards.  Several pieces are derived from material that was published in his 2005 autobiography, Nothing's Sacred.

Track listing
It's Just Not Right – 3:20
Mom and Pop – 1:25
Dr. Fuck Phil (Or, How Do You Top This) – 2:01
Getting Old Sucks – 1:02
Yom Kippur – 5:10
Candy Corn – 6:24
We Don't Know What We Are Doing Anymore: Air Traffic Control – 9:30
New Orleans – 5:28
Information – 4:45
Headlines Are Punchlines and Crazy Is Crazy – 4:45
That's Fucked Up – 2:01
The Real Problem Is Gay Marriage – 3:24
Rick Santorum: Idiot – 3:58
Congressional Correspondents Dinner – 17:23
Mom and Pop and Paul – 2:21
Terry Schiavo – 6:34
Dead President – 4:54
Thank You and Goodnight – 1:06

Notes
On the first track, Lewis joked that a rule at Carnegie is that he was not allowed to say fuck more than 12 times. Over the course of the album, he says it at least 75 times.

The first track on the album features a hidden track. The track can be heard by playing the beginning of track one and then using the rewind/search button to go back 8:49.

Personnel
The album was produced by Dan Schlissel, and mixed and engineered by Ian Stearns, Leszek Maria Wojcik, and Scott Jacoby, who shared in the Grammy awarded to the album.

References

2006 live albums
Lewis Black albums
Comedy Central Records live albums
Stand-up comedy albums
Grammy Award for Best Comedy Album
Albums recorded at Carnegie Hall
2010s comedy albums
2010s spoken word albums
Spoken word albums by American artists
Live spoken word albums